Saud Abdulla Birkey Hamad Al Hajri (born July 19, 1986 in Doha) is a Qatari footballer, who is currently playing as a goalkeeper for Al-Rayyan . He enrolled in Al Rayyan's youth teams on 2 January 1990.

Notes

1985 births
Living people
Qatari footballers
Al-Rayyan SC players
Al Sadd SC players
Al-Shahania SC players
Association football goalkeepers
Qatar Stars League players
Qatari Second Division players